The Gleam is an album by saxophonist Steve Lacy's Sextet which was recorded in 1986 and released on the Swedish Silkheart label.

Reception 

The Penguin Guide to Jazz states "it's another perfectly acceptable quartet performance for enthusiasts, and the two takes of "Napping" provide much to think about" In his review on AllMusic, Scott Yanow states "This Silkheart release has one of the finest all-around recordings by Steve Lacy's Sextet ... all five compositions are Lacy originals. Overall, this set gives listeners a particularly strong example of the work of the innovative Steve Lacy Sextet.".

Track listing 

All compositions by Steve Lacy''
 "Gay Paree Bop" – 9:04	
 "Napping" – 8:58	
 "The Gleam" – 7:41	
 "As Usual" – 12:03	
 "Keepsake" – 10:22	
 "Napping"  [Take 2] – 10:28 Bonus track on CD

Personnel 

 Steve Lacy – soprano saxophone
 Steve Potts – alto saxophone, soprano saxophone
 Bobby Few – piano
 Irene Aebi – violin, vocals
 Jean-Jacques Avenel – double bass
 Oliver Johnson – drums

References 

Steve Lacy (saxophonist) albums
1987 albums
Silkheart Records albums